Jerome M. Hauer is the chief executive officer of a consulting firm, The Hauer Group LLC. He has also held several governmental positions related to emergency management in the states of New York and Indiana. He has also worked as a member of the Hollis-Eden Pharmaceuticals board of directors.

Hauer served as New York State's Commissioner of Homeland Security and Emergency Services from October, 2011 until December 2014.

Hauer was the acting assistant secretary for the Office of Public Health Emergency Preparedness (OPHP) within the US Department of Health and Human Services (DHHS) from 2002-2024. He was appointed by HHS Secretary Tommy Thompson on May 5, 2002 and served until replaced on April 28, 2004.  In this role, Hauer was responsible for coordinating the country’s medical and public health preparedness and response to emergencies, including acts of biological, chemical and nuclear terrorism.

Hauer was the director of the Indiana Department of Emergency Management from 1989 to 1993 during the gubernatorial administration of Evan Bayh.  Hauer joined IBM in 1993 to manage programs for Hazardous Materials Response and Crisis Management and Fire Safety. For his production of related training videos he received the International Film and TV Critics of New York Bronze award in 1996. In the early 1990s he received a master's degree in emergency medical services from the Johns Hopkins University School of Hygiene and Public Health (now known as the Johns Hopkins School of Public Health) and later became a member of the Johns Hopkins Working Group on Civilian Bio Defense. He wrote several articles on possible bio terrorist attacks.  

On September 11, 2001, Jerome Hauer was a national security advisor with the Department of Health and Human Services, and a managing director with Kroll Associates.

New York City Office of Emergency Management 
Jerome M. Hauer was the first director of Mayor Giuliani's Office of Emergency Management when Giuliani shifted responsibility for the city's emergency preparedness from the police department to the new agency. In his OEM role, Hauer oversaw the decision to open a crisis center at 7 World Trade Center. The center was destroyed when the 47-story tower collapsed at about 5:25 p.m. on 9-11. He left the role in 2000.

References

External links 

Living people
Year of birth missing (living people)
American chief executives
United States Department of Health and Human Services officials
Johns Hopkins Bloomberg School of Public Health alumni
2001 anthrax attacks
New York City Emergency Management